The Field Elm cultivar Ulmus minor 'Schuurhoek' was originally an old, nameless clone cultivated c.1880 in the vicinity of Goes, Netherlands, which was taken back into cultivation as 'Schuurhoek' by the van't Westeinde nursery (now 'Kwekerij Westhof') at 's-Heer Abtskerke, Zeeland, in the 1950s. It was identified as U. carpinifolia (:U. minor) by Fontaine (1968), though treated as a cultivar of U. × hollandica by some authorities.

Description
A tall tree, the trunk covered with light branches over its entire length, and reputedly very resistant to exposure.

Pests and diseases
No resistance to Dutch elm disease has been noted, and the tree is susceptible to Verticillium wilt.

Cultivation
The elm was originally cultivated as a windbreak tree in coastal areas of the Netherlands. It is not known to have been introduced to North America or Australasia.

Etymology
The tree is named for the small rural district of Schuurhoek in Zeeland.

Notable trees
F. J. Fontaine reported in 1968 a fairly close-planted, c.80-year old stand on the dykes between
Ovezande and Oudelande, forming a tall, hedge-shaped windbreak.

Accessions
Europe
Wijdemeren City Council, Netherlands. Elm collection, included in elm trials Ankeveen 2009

References

External links
 
 
 
 

Field elm cultivar
Goes
Ulmus articles with images
Ulmus